Bryantsburg may refer to the following places:

 Bryantsburg, Indiana
 Bryantsburg, Iowa